Carrhotus is a genus of jumping spiders that was first described by Tamerlan Thorell in 1891. The name is derived from the Greek Κάῤῥωτος.

Species
 it contains thirty-three species, found in Asia, Europe, Africa, and Brazil:

Carrhotus affinis Caporiacco, 1934 – Libya
Carrhotus albolineatus (C. L. Koch, 1846) – Indonesia (Java)
Carrhotus andhra Caleb, 2020 – India
Carrhotus assam Caleb, 2020 – India, Nepal
Carrhotus barbatus (Karsch, 1880) – Philippines
Carrhotus bellus Wanless, 1984 – Seychelles
Carrhotus catagraphus Jastrzebski, 1999 – Nepal
Carrhotus coronatus (Simon, 1885) – China, Vietnam to Indonesia (Java)
Carrhotus erus Jastrzebski, 1999 – India, Nepal
Carrhotus harringtoni Prószyński, 1992 – Madagascar
Carrhotus kamjeensis Jastrzebski, 1999 – Bhutan
Carrhotus malayanus Prószyński, 1992 – Malaysia
Carrhotus occidentalis (Denis, 1947) – Egypt
Carrhotus olivaceus (Peckham & Peckham, 1907) – Borneo
Carrhotus operosus Jastrzebski, 1999 – Nepal
Carrhotus s-bulbosus Jastrzebski, 2009 – Nepal
Carrhotus samchiensis Jastrzebski, 1999 – Bhutan
Carrhotus sannio (Thorell, 1877) – Réunion, China, Nepal, India to Vietnam and Indonesia (Sulawesi)
Carrhotus sarahcrewsae Cao & Li, 2016 – China
Carrhotus scriptus Simon, 1902 – Gabon
Carrhotus silanthi Caleb, 2020 – India
Carrhotus singularis Simon, 1902 – South Africa
Carrhotus spiridonovi Logunov, 2021 – India
Carrhotus subaffinis Caporiacco, 1947 – Ethiopia
Carrhotus sufflavus Jastrzebski, 2009 – Bhutan
Carrhotus sundaicus Prószyński & Deeleman-Reinhold, 2010 – Indonesia (Lombok)
Carrhotus taprobanicus Simon, 1902 – Sri Lanka
Carrhotus tholpettyensis Sudhin, Nafin, Caleb & Sudhikumar, 2021 – India
Carrhotus tristis Thorell, 1895 – India, Myanmar, Taiwan
Carrhotus viduus (C. L. Koch, 1846) (type) – Iran, India to China
Carrhotus viridiaureus (Simon, 1902) – Brazil
Carrhotus xanthogramma (Latreille, 1819) – Europe, Turkey, Caucasus, Russia (Europe to Far East), China, Korea, Japan
Carrhotus yunnanensis (Song, 1991) – China

Gallery

References

Salticidae
Salticidae genera
Spiders of Africa
Spiders of Asia
Spiders of South America
Taxa named by Tamerlan Thorell